Mateusz Gucman (born 19 April 1980 in Głubczyce) is a Polish Freestyle wrestler who competed in the 2008 Summer Olympics in Beijing.

At the 2008 Summer Olympics he finished 17th in the heavyweight competition (96 kg) in wrestling.

External links
sports-reference

1980 births
Living people
Polish male sport wrestlers
Olympic wrestlers of Poland
Wrestlers at the 2008 Summer Olympics
People from Głubczyce
Sportspeople from Opole Voivodeship